Palaemnema is a genus of dragonflies in the family Platystictidae. They are commonly known as shadowdamsels and are found in the New World, from Arizona to Peru and French Guiana.

Characteristics
Members of this genus are quite diverse. They reside in dense shade near streamlets that trickle though tropical forests. The majority are black with blue markings, though some are entirely black. They mostly have a blue thorax and a blue tip to the abdomen and are similar in size to large pond damsels. The prothorax is large and the legs long. Males have forceps-shaped cerci (appendages at the tip of the abdomen).

Species
The genus contains the following species:

References

Platystictidae
Taxa named by Edmond de Sélys Longchamps
Zygoptera genera
Taxonomy articles created by Polbot